The Fontaine de la Rotonde is a historic fountain in Aix-en-Provence, Bouches-du-Rhône, France.

Location
It is located on the Place de la Rotonde, at the bottom of the Cours Mirabeau in the centre of Aix-en-Provence.

History
The Place de la Rotonde was built from 1840 to 1850. Ten years later, in 1860, Théophile de Tournadre designed this fountain. 

It is 32 metre wide and 12 metre high. It is surrounded by bronze sculptures of twelve lions, sirens, swans, and angels on the backs of dolphins. At the top of the fountain are three sculptures of female figures presenting Justice (towards the Cours Mirabeau), Agriculture (towards Marseille) and the Fine Arts (towards Avignon). They were sculpted by Joseph-Marius Ramus (1805-1888), Hippolyte Ferrat (1822-1882) and Louis-Félix Chabaud (1824-1902).

The water first came from the Zola Canal built in 1854. In 1875, it came from the Verdon Canal. It now comes from the Canal de Provence.

Gallery

References

Buildings and structures in Aix-en-Provence
Cultural infrastructure completed in 1860
Fountains in France